The Arinos River is a river in Brazil. It is located east of, and empties into, the Juruena River.  Some of the Suyá Indians, a Gê-speaking people of central Brazil, migrated from the state of Maranhão to this river.

References
Arinos River. (2009). In Encyclopædia Britannica. Retrieved September 14, 2009, from Encyclopædia Britannica Online: http://www.britannica.com/EBchecked/topic/34318/Arinos-River

Footnotes

Rivers of Mato Grosso